Chugolabad (also Romanized as Chūgolābād; also known as Chūbābād) is a village in Bazan Rural District, in the Central District of Javanrud County, Kermanshah Province, Iran. At the 2006 census, its population was 95, in 17 families.

References 

Populated places in Javanrud County